The Patriotic Oath is one of two national pledges of the Philippines, the other being the Pledge of Allegiance to the Flag. It is commonly recited at flag ceremonies of schools—especially public schools—immediately after singing the Philippine national anthem  but before reciting the Pledge of Allegiance to the Flag.

Custom
Recitation of the Panatà is required by law at all public and private educational institutions. By custom, this is observed in institutions meant for Filipinos or containing a majority of Filipino nationals. This guideline was set in Republic Act No. 1265, one of many national symbols laws, which was approved on July 11, 1955. The act was implemented in schools through Department Order No. 8 of what is now the Department of Education, which was approved on July 21, 1955. The tagalog version of the pledge was derived by the original English version known "Partriotic Oath" penned in 1935, it was later translated by Benjamin Trinidad. The Panatà was revised in November 9, 2001 by then Secretary of Education Raul Roco, using shorter lines in less formal Tagalog. The oath was revised and amended on February 14, 2023 by Vice President and Secretary of Education Sara Duterte replacing the words "nagdarasal" to "nananalangin".

Although Department Order No. 8 states that the Panatà may be recited in English or any Philippine language, the Panatà is usually recited today in Tagalog, of which two versions exist: the current text is a shorter rendering of the English original, while the older version is a more direct translation.

Text

1993 Jehovah's Witnesses expulsion controversy
In 1993, a controversy erupted when 70 adherents of the Christian sect Jehovah's Witnesses: 68 students and two teachers, were expelled and fired respectively from a school in Cebu for their failure to salute the flag, sing the Philippine National Anthem, and recite the patriotic oath. According to Jehovah's Witnesses teachings, flag ceremonies, flag salutes, and patriotic oaths are viewed as acts of worship or religious devotion, the latter two of which they believe can only be rendered to God alone and not to a person or an object. The same sect also upholds the teaching that flags of countries are considered as images; the act of honoring an image being constituted as idolatry.

The Cebu Division Superintendent argued in a court hearing that the students and the teacher violated Republic Act No. 1265, the law making the flag ceremony compulsory for all schools, citing the case of Gerona et al v. Secretary of Education. The superintendent also argued separation of church and state, stating the flag is devoid of religious significance and does not involve any religious ceremony, and that giving the JWs right to exemption would disrupt school discipline and demoralize the rest of the school population, which by far constitutes the great majority.

Evidence showed that none of the aggrieved parties engaged in "external acts" or behavior that would offend the people who believe in expressing their love of country through the observance of the flag ceremony even if they did not take part in the compulsory flag ceremony, having only quietly stood at attention during the event to show their respect for the right of those who choose to participate in the solemn proceedings.

The Court ruled in favor of the expelled students and the fired teachers on the grounds that expulsion due to religious beliefs is invalid, explaining the importance of freedom of religion in the Philippines in an opinion written by justice Carolina Griño-Aquino:

The students were later allowed to re-enroll in the school they were expelled from, and the teachers were allowed to resume their duties.

See also
Flag of the Philippines

References

Philippine culture
Oaths of allegiance